Oeufs en meurette are a traditional dish from Burgundian cuisine based on poached eggs and meurette sauce or bourguignon sauce.

Description

The dish is made with poached eggs accompanied by a meurette sauce/bourguignon sauce (made up of Burgundy red wine, bacon, onions and shallots browned in butter and served with toasted garlic bread.

See also
 Burgundy wine
 Egg (food)
 List of brunch foods
 Poached egg

References

External links

Recipe for Eggs Meurette (French Wiki Books - in French)
Vin et cuisine (French Wiki - in French)
Cuisine bourguignonne (French Wiki - in French)

Egg dishes
Culture of Burgundy